Richard Eedes may refer to:

 Richard Edes, English churchman
 Richard Eedes (divine)